Running on Waves is a 1967 Soviet-Bulgarian drama film directed by Pavel Lyubimov.

Plot 
Pianist Garvey goes on tour. He gets off the train to buy cigarettes, and learns from the saleswoman that the cities that Green invented (the author of the eponymous novel) are real. Moreover: they are a short bus ride away. Harvey, without hesitation, decides to visit such a city...

Cast 
 Sava Hashamov as Garvey
 Rolan Bykov as Captain Chez
 Margarita Terekhova as Biche Seniel / Frezi Grant
 Natalya Bogunova as Daisy
 Oleg Zhakov as Proctor
 Yevgeni Fridman as Butler
 Vasil Popiliev as Toboggan
 Yordan Matev as Commissar (as I. Matev)
 Ani Spasova
 N. Nikolayeva

References

External links 
 

1967 films
1960s Russian-language films
Soviet drama films
Bulgarian drama films
1967 drama films